The M6 Motorway is an under-construction motorway consisting of twin, 4-kilometre long tunnels linking the M8 Motorway at Arncliffe to President Avenue at Kogarah. Stage 1 started major construction in November 2021 and is expected to open by late 2025. The possibility of future extensions to the south will be accommodated by providing stub tunnels in the project. 

The project will include new shared cycle and pedestrian pathways, as well as a new pedestrian bridge across President Avenue. There will also be an upgrade of the Princes Highway and President Avenue intersection. As part of the motorway, a motorway control centre and tunnel ventilation facilities will be built. 

In June 2022, the NSW Government announced that some proposed major infrastructure projects including Stage 2 of the M6 Motorway, the Beaches Link and the Great Western Highway Blackheath to Little Hartley Tunnel would be shelved indefinitely, due to market constraints and labour shortages.

History

Early proposals

Princes Motorway, formerly F6 Southern Freeway, is an existing motorway linking Sydney and Wollongong, with its northern terminus currently at Waterfall. There had been previous proposals to extend the F6 northwards into inner Sydney since the 1950s, but no proposal has come into fruition. Only the six-lane Captain Cook Bridge and a short connecting section of Taren Point Road to the south were built and opened in May 1965 as part of the F6 extension proposal.

In the mid 2010s, the F6 extension project was revived under the Liberal-National coalition state government. As part of modifications made during the planning stage of the WestConnex project, stub tunnels was added to the New M5 (now M8) tunnel to allow for an extension connection to it by the F6 extension. In June 2016 the Roads & Maritime Services commenced geotechnical analysis to determine underground rock and soil conditions on the former F6 corridor from Waterfall to the Sydney Orbital Network at Rockdale with a view into developing a possible link between the Princes Motorway and the Orbital Network. It was further reported in October 2016 that any extension would be known as SouthConnex.

Current proposal
In June 2017, it was revealed that the state government had reviewed a 3.6 billion dollar train tunnel between Thirroul and Waterfall on the Illawarra railway line that could reduce travel time between Sydney and Wollongong by 22 minutes, but that rail improvements were being sidetracked in favour of improving and extending the Motorway.  Later in September 2017, a state government leak showed the extent of the route, to be carried out in multiple sections which would largely follow the original planned route. The leaked document referred to the road as South Link. Sections included tunnels to the northern side of the Captain Cook Bridge, a bridge duplication allowing for motorway traffic to use the existing bridge and local traffic to keep access. To the south of the bridge, a surface motorway would run through current parks and reserves which had been left for the original route, then run along the route of the current Princes Highway with tunnels bypassing the towns of Heathcote and Waterfall before joining the existing freeway. 

In October 2017, the government announced it will proceed with Stage 1 of the F6 extension, which will run via two 4 km tunnels linking the New M5 (now M8) tunnels at Arncliffe to President Avenue at Kogarah. Stage 1 was originally planned to start construction in 2020 and open to traffic in late 2024.

In October 2019, the government announced a name change of the extension to "M6 Motorway", removing its reference to the defunct F6 name. The renaming to a different route number was due to general renaming of roads in NSW to reflect new national route numbers. Additionally the decision was made not to connect the future southern end of M6 at Loftus to the northern end of the M1 Princes Motorway at Waterfall, resulting in the two motorways to remain separated in the short-term. The completion date of Stage 1 was also pushed back to late 2025, with major construction planned to begin by early 2022.  In December 2019, planning approval for M6 Stage 1 was granted.

In June 2022, the NSW Government announced that some proposed major infrastructure projects including Stage 2 of the M6 Motorway would be shelved indefinitely, due to market constraints and labour shortages.

Construction
Prior to the start of major construction, associated construction works began on open spaces near the M6 corridor in August 2020. These include upgrades to Ador Park and McCarthy Reserve at Rockdale, and Brighton Memorial Playing Fields at Brighton-Le-Sands. The upgrades are due to the upcoming construction impacts on the open space and recreational facilities at Rockdale Bicentennial Park.

In May 2021, the design and construction contract for Stage 1 was awarded to CIMIC Group's subsidiaries CPB and UGL, in a joint venture with Ghella. Major construction of Stage 1 began on 29 November 2021.

Tolls
Toll prices are proposed to be $2.44 each way when the first stage of M6 opens. However, as all traffic will have to utilise the M8, motorists will also have to pay WestConnex tolls in addition to the M6 toll.

References

External links 
M6 Stage 1 - Project Information - Transport for NSW
M6 Stage 1 Web Portal - Transport for NSW

Highways in Sydney
Toll roads in Australia
Toll tunnels in Australia
Tunnels in Sydney
Proposed roads in Australia